The Federal Reserve Bank of San Francisco Los Angeles Branch is one of four branches of the Federal Reserve Bank of San Francisco.
The branch is located in Los Angeles.

Current Board of Directors
The following people are on the board of directors as of 2013:

Appointed by the Federal Reserve Bank

Appointed by the Board of Governors

See also

 Federal Reserve Act
 Federal Reserve System
 Federal Reserve Bank
 Federal Reserve Districts
 Federal Reserve Branches
 Federal Reserve Bank of San Francisco
 Federal Reserve Bank of San Francisco Portland Branch
 Federal Reserve Bank of San Francisco Salt Lake City Branch
 Federal Reserve Bank of San Francisco Seattle Branch
 Federal Reserve Bank of San Francisco Building (San Francisco, California)
 Structure of the Federal Reserve System

References

Federal Reserve branches